Nor Kyurin is a village in the Masis Municipality of the Ararat Province of Armenia. Nor Kyurin means New Kyurin, pronounced [gjurin] or [gyrin] in Western Armenian.  It was named after the city of Gürün, which had a significant Armenian population until the Armenian genocide.

References 
 
 
 

Populated places in Ararat Province